Modern pentathlon was introduced at the Youth Olympic Games at the inaugural edition in 2010 for both boys, girls and mixed relay. In the 2010 Summer Youth Olympics in Singapore it consisted of four of the five modern pentathlon disciplines: fencing, swimming, running and shooting. There was no riding. In 2014 Summer Youth Olympics and 2018 Summer Youth Olympics it consisted of five modern pentathlon disciplines: fencing, swimming, running, shooting, and horse riding.

Qualification

Each National Olympic Committee (NOC) can enter a maximum of 2 competitors, 1 per each gender. The spots were reallocated to the world rankings. The remaining 42 places shall be decided in three stages; firstly four continental qualification tournaments, World Youth A Championships and finally the Olympic Youth A Pentathlon World Rankings.

Events
Modern pentathlon has been on the Olympic program continuously since 2010.

Medal table

Medalists

References

External links 
Modern Pentathlon Results at the official site.
Official Results Book – Modern Pentathlon

Sports at the Summer Youth Olympics
Modern pentathlon at multi-sport events
Modern pentathlon at the Youth Olympics